Plainfield is a census-designated place (CDP) comprising the main village of the town of Plainfield, Washington County, Vermont, United States. The population of the CDP was 401 at the 2010 census.

Geography
Goddard College is located just to the west of the CDP.

Plainfield is located on the Winooski River.

References

Census-designated places in Vermont
Census-designated places in Washington County, Vermont
Plainfield, Vermont